Sona Ram Sinku is an Indian politician and an MLA elected from Jaganathpur constituency of Jharkhand state as a member of Indian National Congress in 2019.

References

Year of birth missing (living people)
Place of birth missing (living people)
Living people
Lok Sabha members from Jharkhand
People from Jharkhand
Jharkhand MLAs 2019–2024